Jorge Alberto López (born 1955 in Monterrey, Mexico) is a physicist and educator and the Schumaker Professor of Physics at the University of Texas at El Paso. He is known for his work in heavy ion collision dynamics and for his outreach to the Hispanic community in the United States to increase diversity in physics, effective teaching and mentoring of undergraduate students (particularly underrepresented minorities), development of bilingual physics education programs, and building collaborations between American and Latin American universities. He is one of the founders of the National Society of Hispanic Physicists and author of books on nuclear physics, surface science, and statistical analysis of elections.

Awards
2018  Nature Mentoring Award
2018 Texas A&M University College of Science Distinguished Former Student
2016 University of Texas System Regents Outstanding Teaching Award
2015 American Physical Society Edward A. Bouchet Award
2014  White House Presidential Award for Excellence in Science, Mathematics, & Engineering Mentoring
2014 American Physical Society Division of Nuclear Physics Mentoring Award
2011 Society of Hispanic Professional Engineers Educator of the Year Award
2010 Society of Mexican American Engineers and Scientists Outstanding MAEStro Award
2007 American Physical Society Fellow

References

External links
 Official site

Living people
Fellows of the American Physical Society
20th-century Mexican physicists
Mexican emigrants to the United States
1955 births